Tonight in Canberra was a short-lived Australian television series which aired in 1968 on Canberra station CTC-7. Running from April to August, it aired Mondays at 10:05PM. The series presented a mix of interviews and variety acts. It was hosted by David Brice, who was assisted by Steve Liebmann. For example, one episode featured an interview with Christmas card designer Gordon Fraser and an interview with an inspector for the RSPCA while a different episode featured an interview with NSW Minister for Lands, Tom Lewis, and an interview with chairman of the ACT Advisory Council, Jim Pead.

External links

See also
In Melbourne Tonight
Adelaide Tonight
Sydney Tonight

External links
Tonight in Canberra on IMDb

Seven Network original programming
1968 Australian television series debuts
1968 Australian television series endings
Australian television talk shows
Black-and-white Australian television shows
English-language television shows
Australian variety television shows